Pugal is a town in the Bikaner district of Rajasthan, India. It is also the headquarters of the tehsil in the pugal Sub-division with the same name.

Geography
It has an average elevation of 145 metres (869 feet).

Demographics
 India census, Pugal had a population of 6,314. Males constitute 3,416 of the population and females 2,898.

References

Cities and towns in Bikaner district